The Dunedin Multidisciplinary Health and Development Study  (also known as the Dunedin Study) is a detailed study of human health, development and behaviour. Based at the University of Otago in New Zealand, the Dunedin Study has followed the lives of 1037 babies born between 1 April 1972 and 31 March 1973 at Dunedin's former Queen Mary Maternity Centre since their birth. Teams of national and international collaborators work on the Dunedin Study, including a team at Duke University in the United States. The research is constantly evolving to encompass research made possible by new technology and seeks to answer questions about how people's early years impact mental and physical health as they age.

The study is now in its fifth decade and has produced over 1300 publications and reports, many of which have influenced or helped inform policy makers in New Zealand and overseas; many of these can be found on the publications section of their website.

History
The Dunedin Study was the idea of psychology student Phil Silva, who worked on a neonatology survey involving 250 children with learning and behavioural issues. He identified that 10% had significant problems that had previously been undiagnosed, a topic that he researched in his 1978 doctoral thesis. He realised that a larger sample size was needed; this resulted in the Dunedin Study. The original pool of study members was selected from children born at the Queen Mary Maternity Centre in Dunedin who were still living in the wider Otago region three years later. In early years the study was not well funded and the local community helped collect data. The study members include 535 males and 502 females, 1013 singletons and 12 sets of twins. At the age 38 assessment, only one-third of members still resided in Dunedin; most of the remainder lived elsewhere in New Zealand and Australia. Study members were assessed at age three, and then at ages 5, 7, 9, 11, 13, 15, 18, 21, 26, 32,38 and, most recently, at age 45 (2017–2019). Future assessments are scheduled for age 52. The study's original director, Silva, retired in 2000. Since 2000, Professor Richie Poulton has been the study's director.

During an assessment, study members are brought back to Dunedin from wherever in the world they live. They participate in a day of interviews, physical tests, dental examinations, blood tests, computer questionnaires, and surveys. Sub-studies of the Dunedin Study include the Family Health History Study which involved the parents of Dunedin Study members to find out about the health of family members (2003–2006); the ongoing Parenting Study which focuses on the Dunedin Study member and their first three-year-old child; and the Next Generation Study which involves the offspring of Dunedin Study members as they turn 15 and looks at the lifestyles, behaviours, attitudes, and health of today's teenagers. It aims to see how these have changed from when the original Study Members were 15 (in 1987–88). This means that information across three generations of the same families will be available.

Great emphasis is placed on retention of study members. At the most recent (age 45) assessments, 94% of all living eligible study members, or 961 people, participated. This is unprecedented for a longitudinal study, with many others worldwide experiencing  more than 40% drop-out rates.

The resulting database has produced a wealth of information on many aspects of human health and development.  over 1,200 papers, reports, book chapters and other publications have been produced using findings from the study. The multidisciplinary aspect of the study has always been a central focus, with information ranging across:
 Cardiovascular health and risk factors
 Respiratory health
 Oral health
 Sexual and reproductive health
 Mental health
 Psychosocial functioning
 Other health, including sensory, musculo-skeletal, and digestive

A book, From Child to Adult: Dunedin Multidisciplinary Health and Development Study, was published in 1996 and aimed at presenting the major findings in a form accessible to the non-specialist. It only includes information up to the age-21 assessment. Future plans for the Dunedin Multidisciplinary Health and Development Study include another popular science book, upgrading their website for more non-specialist appeal, and introducing more resources for the general public.

This study was awarded the 2016 Prime Minister's Science Prize. In 2022 it was awarded the Royal Society Te Apārangi's Rutherford Medal.

Media reports of results
 2016, Why Am I?, 2016 four-part television series shown on TV One in New Zealand and on TVOntario in Canada as Predict My Future: The Science of Us
 2006, "Smacking study hits at claims of harm" (archive)
 2006, "Physical punishment was extremely prevalent..."
 2005, "Cannabis and psychotic behaviour"
 2002, "MAOA gene and violence"
 2001, "Study clears cannabis as root of violence"

See also
Up Series
British birth cohort studies

References

External links
The Dunedin Study Website
Background
News about the study
Searchable database of the study's publications

Cannabis research
History of Dunedin
Cohort studies
Research in New Zealand
Health in New Zealand
Health research
Childhood in New Zealand
Self-control
Multidisciplinary research institutes